Mountain totara may refer to:

 Podocarpus laetus, a coniferous tree endemic to New Zealand
 Podocarpus nivalis, a coniferous shrub endemic to New Zealand